The Guyana Amazon Warriors is a franchise cricket team of the Caribbean Premier League based in Providence, Georgetown, Guyana. The team is the representative cricket team of Guyana in the Caribbean Premier League. It was one of the six teams created in 2013 for the inaugural season of the tournament.

The team plays its home games at Providence Stadium, located in Guyana and like the league's other franchises, draw the majority of its players from West Indian domestic teams.  It has appeared in five of the seven CPL finals, but has lost in the finals all five
times.

Former Guyanese cricket legend Roger Harper was confirmed as the franchise's inaugural coach in early February 2015.

History

The  Guyana Amazon Warriors were one of the six teams created for the Caribbean Premier League's inaugural 2013 season. In 2013, they were runners up in the first tournament and were defeated by the Jamaica Tallawahs by 7 wickets at Queen's Park Oval in Port of Spain, Trinidad. The team was captained by Ramnaresh Sarwan which included overseas star like Tillakaratne Dilshan, James Franklin, Lasith Malinga as well as West Indian stars Sunil Narine, Lendl Simmons, Denesh Ramdin etc. Krishmar Santokie was leading wicket-taker in the season.

In 2014, they finished second in the group stage behind the Barbados Tridents and were again defeated by the Barbados Tridents by 8 runs (D/L) in the final played at Warner Park, Basseterre, St Kitts. The team was captained by Sunil Narine which included overseas stars like Martin Guptill, Mohammad Hafeez, Jimmy Neesham as well as West Indian stars Krishmar Santokie, Lendl Simmons, Denesh Ramdin etc. Lendl Simmons with his 445 runs in the season was Player of the series.

In 2015, they again finished second in group stage behind Barbados Tridents but lost to Trinbago Knight Riders in semi-final by 6 wickets played at Queen's Park Oval in Port of Spain, Trinidad. The team was captained by Denesh Ramdin which included overseas star like Lasith Malinga, Thisara Perera, Tillakaratne Dilshan, Brad Hodge, Marchant de Lange, David Wiese and Umar Akmal  as well as West Indian stars Shivnarine Chanderpaul, Veerasammy Permaul, Lendl Simmons, Sunil Narine etc.

For 2016 Caribbean Premier League, Amazon Warriors roped in Martin Guptill as their captain replacing Denesh Ramdin and was joined by International cricketer like Sohail Tanvir, Dwayne Smith, Chris Lynn and Adam Zampa as well as some local star like Chris Barnwell, Jason Mohammed, Rayad Emrit etc.

Current squad
 Players with international caps are listed in bold.
As of 4 April 2022

Results summary 

 Abandoned matches are counted as NR (no result)
 Win or loss by super over or boundary count are counted as tied.
 Tied+Win - Counted as a win and Tied+Loss - Counted as a loss
 NR indicates no result

Administration and support staff

Statistics

Most runs 

Source: ESPNcricinfo, Last updated: 26 August 2021

Most wickets 

Source: ESPNcricinfo, Last updated: 26 August 2021

Seasons

Caribbean Premier League

The 6ixty

See also
 Guyana Amazon Warriors (WCPL)

References

External links
 Guyana on CPLT20.com
 
 

Cricket in Guyana
Cricket teams in the West Indies
Caribbean Premier League teams
Cricket clubs established in 2013
2013 establishments in Guyana